Imbrie is a surname. Notable people with the surname include:

Andrew Imbrie (1921–2007), American classical composer
John Imbrie (1925–2016), American oceanographer
William Imbrie (1845–1928), American missionary

See also
Imbrie Farm, historic farmstead in Hillsboro, Oregon